Diatonic and chromatic are terms in music theory that are most often used to characterize scales, and are also applied to musical instruments, intervals, chords, notes, musical styles, and kinds of harmony. They are very often used as a pair, especially when applied to contrasting features of the common practice music of the period 1600–1900.

These terms may mean different things in different contexts. Very often, diatonic refers to musical elements derived from the modes and transpositions of the "white note scale" C–D–E–F–G–A–B. In some usages it includes all forms of heptatonic scale that are in common use in Western music (the major, and all forms of the minor).

Chromatic most often refers to structures derived from the twelve-note chromatic scale, which consists of all semitones. Historically, however, it had other senses, referring in Ancient Greek music theory to a particular tuning of the tetrachord, and to a rhythmic notational convention in mensural music of the 14th to 16th centuries.

History

Greek genera 

In ancient Greece there were three standard tunings (known by the Latin word genus, plural genera) of a lyre. These three tunings were called diatonic, chromatic, and enharmonic, and the sequences of four notes that they produced were called tetrachords ("four strings"). A diatonic tetrachord comprised, in descending order, two whole tones and a semitone, such as A G F E (roughly). In the chromatic tetrachord the second string of the lyre was lowered from G to G, so that the two lower intervals in the tetrachord were semitones, making the pitches A G F E. In the enharmonic tetrachord the second string of the lyre was lowered further to G, so that the two lower interval in the tetrachord were quarter tones, making the pitches A G F E (where F is F lowered by a quarter tone). For all three tetrachords, only the middle two strings varied in their pitch.

Medieval coloration 
The term cromatico (Italian) was occasionally used in the Medieval and Renaissance periods to refer to the coloration (Latin coloratio) of certain notes. The details vary widely by period and place, but generally the addition of a colour (often red) to an empty or filled head of a note, or the "colouring in" of an otherwise empty head of a note, shortens the duration of the note. In works of the Ars Nova from the 14th century, this was used to indicate a temporary change in metre from triple to duple, or vice versa. This usage became less common in the 15th century as open white noteheads became the standard notational form for minims (half-notes) and longer notes called white mensural notation. These uses for the word have no relationship to the modern meaning of chromatic, but the sense survives in the current term coloratura.

Renaissance chromaticism 

The term chromatic began to approach its modern usage in the 16th century. For instance Orlando Lasso's Prophetiae Sibyllarum opens with a prologue proclaiming, "these chromatic songs, heard in modulation, are those in which the mysteries of the Sibyls are sung, intrepidly," which here takes its modern meaning referring to the frequent change of key and use of chromatic intervals in the work. (The Prophetiae belonged to an experimental musical movement of the time, called musica reservata). This usage comes from a renewed interest in the Greek genera, especially its chromatic tetrachord, notably by the influential theorist Nicola Vicentino in his treatise on ancient and modern practice, 1555.

Diatonic scales 

Medieval theorists defined scales in terms of the Greek tetrachords. The gamut was the series of pitches from which all the Medieval "scales" (or modes, strictly) notionally derive, and it may be thought of as constructed in a certain way from diatonic tetrachords. The origin of the word gamut is explained in the article Guidonian hand; here the word is used in one of the available senses: the all-encompassing gamut as described by Guido d'Arezzo (which includes all of the modes).

The intervals from one note to the next in this Medieval gamut are all tones or semitones, recurring in a certain pattern with five tones (T) and two semitones (S) in any given octave. The semitones are separated as much as they can be, between alternating groups of three tones and two tones. Here are the intervals for a string of ascending notes (starting with F) from the gamut:
... –T–T–T–S–T–T–S–T–T–T–S–T– ...
And here are the intervals for an ascending octave (the seven intervals separating the eight notes A–B–C–D–E–F–G–A) from the gamut:
T–S–T–T–S–T–T (five tones and two semitones)

The white keys are the modern analog of the gamut. In its most strict definition, therefore, a diatonic scale is one that may be derived from the pitches represented in successive white keys of the piano (or a transposition thereof). This would include the major scale, and the natural minor scale (same as the descending form of the melodic minor), but not the old ecclesiastical church modes, most of which included both versions of the "variable" note B/B.

Modern meanings 
There are specific applications in the music of the Common Practice Period, and later music that shares its core features.

Most, but not all writers, accept the natural minor as diatonic. As for other forms of the minor:

"Exclusive" usage
Some writers consistently classify the other variants of the minor scale – the melodic minor (ascending form) and the harmonic minor – as non-diatonic, since they are not transpositions of the white-note pitches of the piano. Among such theorists there is no agreed general term that encompasses the major and all forms of the minor scale.
"Inclusive" usage
Some writers consistently include the melodic and harmonic minor scales as diatonic also. For this group, every scale standardly used in common practice music and much similar later music is either diatonic (the major, and all forms of the minor) or chromatic.
"Mixed" usage
Still other writers mix these two meanings of diatonic (and conversely for chromatic), and this can lead to confusions and misconceptions. Sometimes context makes the intended meaning clear.

Some other meanings of the term diatonic scale take the extension to harmonic and melodic minor even further, to be even more inclusive.

In general, diatonic is most often used inclusively with respect to music that restricts itself to standard uses of traditional major and minor scales. When discussing music that uses a larger variety of scales and modes (including much jazz, rock, and some tonal 20th-century concert music), writers often adopt the exclusive use to prevent confusion.

Chromatic scale 

Chromatic scale on C: full octave ascending and descending

A chromatic scale consists of an ascending or descending sequence of pitches, always proceeding by semitones. Such a sequence of pitches is produced, for example, by playing all the black and white keys of a piano in order. The structure of a chromatic scale is therefore uniform throughout—unlike major and minor scales, which have tones and semitones in particular arrangements (and an augmented second, in the harmonic minor).

Musical instruments 
Some instruments, such as the violin, can play any scale; others, such as the glockenspiel, are restricted to the scale to which they are tuned. Among this latter class, some instruments, such as the piano, are always tuned to a chromatic scale, and can be played in any key, while others are restricted to a diatonic scale, and therefore to a particular key. Some instruments, such as the harmonica, harp, and glockenspiel, are available in both diatonic and chromatic versions (although it is possible to play chromatic notes on a diatonic harmonica, they require extended embouchure techniques, and some chromatic notes are only usable by advanced players).

Intervals 

Because diatonic scale is itself ambiguous, distinguishing intervals is also ambiguous. For example, the interval B–E (a diminished fourth, occurring in C harmonic minor) is considered diatonic if the harmonic minor scale is considered diatonic, but chromatic if the harmonic minor scale is not considered diatonic.

Forte lists the chromatic intervals in major and natural minor as the augmented unison, diminished octave, augmented fifth, diminished fourth, augmented third, diminished sixth, diminished third, augmented sixth, minor second, major seventh, major second, minor seventh, doubly diminished fifth, and doubly augmented fourth.

Additionally, the label chromatic or diatonic for an interval may depend on context. For instance, in C major, the interval C–E could be considered a chromatic interval because it does not appear in the prevailing diatonic key; conversely, in C minor it would be diatonic. This usage is still subject to the categorization of scales above, e.g. in the B–E example above, classification would still depend on whether the harmonic minor scale is considered diatonic.

In different systems of tuning 

Pythagorean diatonic and chromatic interval: E-F and E-E

In equal temperament, there is no difference in tuning (and therefore in sound) between intervals that are enharmonically equivalent. For example, the notes F and E represent the same pitch, so the diatonic interval C–F (a perfect fourth) sounds the same as its enharmonic equivalent—the chromatic interval C–E (an augmented third).

But in systems other than equal temperament, there is often a difference in tuning between enharmonically equivalent intervals. In systems based on a cycle of fifths, such as Pythagorean tuning and meantone temperament, these alternatives are labelled diatonic or chromatic intervals. Under these systems the cycle of fifths is not circular in the sense that a pitch at one end of the cycle (e.g., G) is not tuned the same as the enharmonic equivalent at its other end (A); they are different by an amount known as a comma.

This broken cycle causes intervals that cross the break to be written as augmented or diminished chromatic intervals. In meantone temperament, for instance, chromatic semitones (E–E) are smaller than diatonic semitones (E–F), With consonant intervals such as the major third the enharmonic equivalent is generally less consonant.

If the tritone is assumed diatonic, the classification of written intervals on this definition is not significantly different from the "drawn from the same diatonic scale" definition above as long as the harmonic minor and ascending melodic minor scale variants are not included.

Chords 

Diatonic chords are generally understood as those that are built using only notes from the same diatonic scale; all other chords are considered chromatic. However, given the ambiguity of diatonic scale, this definition, too, is ambiguous. And for some theorists, chords are only ever diatonic in a relative sense: the augmented triad E–G–B is diatonic "to" or "in" C minor.

On this understanding, the diminished seventh chord built on the leading note is accepted as diatonic in minor keys.

If the strictest understanding of the term diatonic scale is adhered to – whereby only transposed 'white note scales' are considered diatonic – even a major triad on the dominant scale degree in C minor (G–B–D) would be chromatic or altered in C minor. Some writers use the phrase "diatonic to" as a synonym for "belonging to". Therefore a chord is not said to be "diatonic" in isolation, but can be said to be "diatonic to" a particular key if its notes belong to the underlying diatonic scale of the key.

Harmony 

The words diatonic and chromatic are also applied inconsistently to harmony:

 Often musicians call diatonic harmony any kind of harmony inside the major–minor system of common practice. When diatonic harmony is understood in this sense, the supposed term chromatic harmony means little, because chromatic chords are also used in that same system.
 At other times, especially in textbooks and syllabuses for musical composition or music theory, diatonic harmony means harmony that uses only "diatonic chords". According to this usage, chromatic harmony is then harmony that extends the available resources to include chromatic chords: the augmented sixth chords, the Neapolitan sixth, chromatic seventh chords, etc.
 Since the word harmony can be used of single classes of chords (dominant harmony, E minor harmony, for example), diatonic harmony and chromatic harmony can be used in this distinct way also.
However,
 Chromatic harmony may be defined as the use of successive chords that are from two different keys and therefore contain tones represented by the same note symbols but with different accidentals. Four basic techniques produce chromatic harmony under this definition: modal interchange, secondary dominants, melodic tension, and chromatic mediants.

Instrumental compositions of the late Renaissance and early Baroque periods also began experimenting with the expressive possibilities of contrasting diatonic passages of music with chromatic ones.  Here, for example is part of the Virginal Piece ‘His Humour’ by Giles Farnaby.  (The title ‘Humour’ should be interpreted as meaning ‘mood’, here.) The first four bars are largely diatonic.  These are followed by a passage exploiting chromatic harmony, with the upper part forming an ascending, followed by a descending chromatic scale:

In the following passage from the slow movement of Beethoven's Piano Concerto No. 4, Op. 58., the long, flowing melody of the first five bars is almost entirely diatonic, consisting of notes within the scale of E minor, the movement's home key. The only exception is the G sharp in the left hand in the third bar. By contrast, the remaining bars are highly chromatic, using all the notes available to convey a sense of growing intensity as the music builds towards its expressive climax.

A further example may be found in this extract from act 3 of Richard Wagner's opera Die Walküre. The first four bars harmonize a descending chromatic scale with a rich, intoxicating chord progression. In contrast, the bars that follow are entirely diatonic, using notes only within the scale of E major. The passage is intended to convey the god Wotan putting his daughter Brünnhilde into a deep sleep.

Miscellaneous usages

Tones 

In modern usage, the meanings of the terms diatonic note/tone and chromatic note/tone vary according to the meaning of the term diatonic scale. Generally – not universally – a note is understood as diatonic in a context if it belongs to the diatonic scale that is used in that context; otherwise it is chromatic.

Inflection 
The term chromatic inflection (alternatively spelt inflexion) is used in two senses:
 Alteration of a note that makes it (or the harmony that includes it) chromatic rather than diatonic.
 Melodic movement between a diatonic note and a chromatically altered variant (from C to C in G major, or vice versa, for example).

Progression 
The term chromatic progression is used in three senses:
 Movement between harmonies that are not elements of any common diatonic system (that is, not of the same diatonic scale: movement from D–F–A to D–F–A, for example).
 The same as the second sense of chromatic inflection, above.
 In musica ficta and similar contexts, a melodic fragment that includes a chromatic semitone, and therefore includes a chromatic inflection in the second sense, above.

The term diatonic progression is used in two senses:
 Movement between harmonies that both belong to at least one shared diatonic system (from F–A–C to G–B–E, for example, since both occur in C major).
 In musica ficta and similar contexts, a melodic fragment that does not include a chromatic semitone, even if two semitones occur contiguously, as in F–G–A.

Modulation 
 Diatonic modulation is modulation via a diatonic progression.
 Chromatic modulation is modulation via a chromatic progression, in the first sense given above.

Pentatonic scale 
 One very common kind of pentatonic scale that draws its notes from the diatonic scale (in the exclusive sense, above) is sometimes called the diatonic pentatonic scale: C–D–E–G–A[–C], or some other modal arrangement of those notes.
 Other pentatonic scales (such as the pelog scales) may also be construed as reduced forms of a diatonic scale but are not labelled diatonic.

Modern extensions 
Traditionally, and in all uses discussed above, the term diatonic has been confined to the domain of pitch, and in a fairly restricted way. Exactly which scales (and even which modes of those scales) should count as diatonic is unsettled, as shown above. But the broad selection principle itself is not disputed, at least as a theoretical convenience.

Extended pitch selections 
The selection of pitch classes can be generalised to encompass formation of non-traditional scales from the underlying twelve chromatic pitch classes. Or a larger set of underlying pitch classes may be used instead. For example, the octave may be divided into varying numbers of equally spaced pitch classes. The usual number is twelve, giving the conventional set used in Western music. But Paul Zweifel uses a group-theoretic approach to analyse different sets, concluding especially that a set of twenty divisions of the octave is another viable option for retaining certain properties associated with the conventional "diatonic" selections from twelve pitch classes.

Rhythms 
It is possible to generalise this selection principle even beyond the domain of pitch. The diatonic idea has been applied in analysis of some traditional African rhythms, for example. Some selection or other is made from an underlying superset of metrical beats, to produce a "diatonic" rhythmic "scale" embedded in an underlying metrical "matrix". Some of these selections are diatonic in a way similar to the traditional diatonic selections of pitch classes (that is, a selection of seven beats from a matrix of twelve beats – perhaps even in groupings that match the tone-and-semitone groupings of diatonic scales). But the principle may also be applied with even more generality (including even any selection from a matrix of beats of any size).

See also 
 Major and minor
 Universal key

Notes

References 

Ancient Greek music
Byzantine music
Musical scales
Greek music
Harmony
Chromaticism